Mtwara (Portuguese: Montewara) is the capital city of Mtwara Region in southeastern Tanzania. In the 1940s, it was planned and constructed as the export facility for the disastrous Tanganyika groundnut scheme, but was somewhat neglected when the scheme was abandoned in 1951. The city is spread out over a large area planned to accommodate up to 200,000 people. The present population is around 108,000. As part of the development associated with the failed Tanganyika groundnut scheme, Mtwara features a deep-water port that can accommodate ocean-going vessels, and a range of large municipal buildings, including a post office. Recent improvements in the port made it possible for big container ships to berth there.

Transportation

Road
Mtwara has reasonable transport links considering its remoteness in southern Tanzania. It is linked by paved roads with Dar es Salaam and Lindi to the north and Masasi inland and by partially paved roads to Newala in-land to the west. Beyond Masasi the road is newly paved for some 60 km towards Tunduru and the Unity Bridge which provides a crossing point to Mozambique.

Airport
The A19 links it with Mbamba Bay on Lake Malawi in the west. It features an airport with a paved runway that can accommodate medium size passenger jets. Precision Air runs a daily morning flight between Mtwara Airport and Dar es Salaam and Air Tanzania offers a flight in the afternoon. The flight time is around an hour. Facilities for landing do not allow for planes to use the airport when it is hidden in mist.

Bus
Mtwara serves as the access point for a small but growing tourism industry based in nearby Mikindani.
New roads of a good standard were being built in 2013 within the city. Most of the roads have never been sealed.
There is a choice of bus companies which provide daily services between Mtwara and Dar es Salaam. Also regular buses connect with Masasi, the biggest town inland from Mtwara.

Port

The port is the third largest ocean port in the country and was built as part of the failed Tanganyika groundnut scheme. The port was neglected for many years, however with the recent economic boom in the region, the government has spent funds for the upgrade of the port. Recently the port has seen added activity due to the construction of the Dangote cement factory and increased gas exploration activities. The port in the future is planned to facilitate exports such as Cashew nuts, Iron, Coal and Gas. The port also has an Export Processing zone to facilitate the manufacturing industry in the area.

Economy

Iron ore and coal 
Mtwara might be the port for the export of iron ore and coal.  There are plans to build a railway linking Mtwara with Lindi and mines at Mchuchuma and Liganga via Songea.

In the year 2003, there were proposals for transporting coal from the Ludewa and Njombe regions respectively by rail to the port of Mtwara in Southern Tanzania as part of the Mtwara Development Corridor project.

Cement
Mtwara hosts a branch of the Dangote Cement Public Limited Company.

Geography

Climate
Due to close proximity to the equator and the warm Indian Ocean, the city experiences tropical climatic conditions similar to all Tanzanian coastal cities. The city experiences hot and humid weather throughout much of the year and has a tropical wet and dry climate (Köppen: Aw).

Sports

Football (Soccer)
Mtwara is the hometown of Bandari F.C. and NDANDA F. C.

Twin towns – sister cities

Mtwara is twinned with:
 Redditch, United Kingdom

See also
 Railway stations in Tanzania
 Mtwara Development Corridor
 Cashew production in Tanzania
 Sultanate of M’Simbati

References

External links

Regional capitals in Tanzania
Populated places in Mtwara Region